Loculohypoxylon is a genus of fungi in the family Teichosporaceae. This is a monotypic genus, containing the single species Loculohypoxylon grandineum.

References

Pleosporales
Monotypic Dothideomycetes genera